Salvador García may refer to:

Salvador García (boxer), represented Mexico at the 1972 Summer Olympics
Salvador García (fencer)
Salvador García (runner) (born 1962), Mexican marathon runner
Salvador García Acuña (born 1982), football player for Real Estelí F.C. and the Nicaragua national team
Salvador García Puig (born 1961), retired Spanish footballer known as Salva
Salvador García Rodríguez (born 1982), Mexican writer
Salvador Ortiz García (born 1964), Mexican politician